Mozart Santos Batista Júnior, usually known simply as Mozart (born 8 November 1979) is a Brazilian football coach and former player who played in both the defensive midfielder and attacking midfielder positions. He is the current head coach of Atlético Goianiense.

Playing career
Born in Curitiba, Paraná, Mozart started his career with Paraná Clube, before moving to France with FC Girondins de Bordeaux in 1998, although he did not play any games for them. He returned to play in Brazil for Coritiba, joining the club in July 1998 and being initially assigned to the under-20s.

Promoted to the first team for the 1999 season, Mozart subsequently became a starter for the club, and joined fellow top tier side Flamengo in March 2000, for a fee of US$ 3.5 million. At that time, he also appeared for the Olympic national team in the 2000 Summer Olympics.

In October 2000, Mozart was sold to Serie A's Reggina Calcio, for a fee of US$4 million. He subsequently became a regular starter for the side, helping in their promotion back to the first division in 2003.

In August 2005, Mozart moved to Spartak Moscow, for a fee of around €6 million. He terminated his contract with Spartak in March 2009, and the following month he signed for Palmeiras.

Mozart's time at Palmeiras ended in August 2009 when he joined Livorno. He left the club in July 2010, staying more than a year without a club before signing for Chinese side Nanchang Bayi. After that short stint he retired, initially dedicating his time to producing cachaça in his native state.

Managerial career
In June 2013, Mozart was named manager of Canoinhas Atlético Clube for the second division of the Campeonato Catarinense, but was dismissed without managing the team in a single match, after altercations with the club's board. Late in the month, he took over Sport Club Jaraguá in the same state's third division.

On 21 July 2014, Mozart was named Francesco Cozza's assistant at Reggina 1914. In the following year, he returned to Coritiba, being initially named assistant manager of the under-20 squad and later appointed manager of the side in December.

Mozart was later appointed assistant manager of the main squad during the 2019 season, and was named interim manager on 20 August 2020 after the dismissal of Eduardo Barroca. He was in charge for one match, and returned to his assistant role after the arrival of Jorginho.

On 18 September 2020, Mozart was named manager of Série B side CSA. He renewed his contract for a further season on 28 December, and subsequently narrowly missed out promotion to the first division.

On 18 April 2021, Mozart resigned from CSA and took over Chapecoense, newly promoted to the top tier. He was sacked on 27 May, after losing the year's Campeonato Catarinense, and took over Cruzeiro back in the second division on 10 June.

On 30 July 2021, Mozart resigned from Cruzeiro, and returned to CSA exactly one month later. On 13 June 2022, he resigned from the latter side, and took over fellow second division side Guarani fifteen days later.

On 19 February 2023, Mozart was sacked by Bugre after a poor start of the campaign, and took over fellow second division side Atlético Goianiense on 11 March.

International career
Mozart was in the Brazil squad for the 2000 Summer Olympics.

Career statistics

Managerial statistics

References

1979 births
Living people
Footballers from Curitiba
Brazilian footballers
Brazilian expatriate footballers
Olympic footballers of Brazil
Footballers at the 2000 Summer Olympics
Brazilian people of Polish descent
Expatriate footballers in France
Expatriate footballers in Italy
Expatriate footballers in Russia
Expatriate footballers in China
Association football midfielders
Campeonato Brasileiro Série A players
Serie A players
Serie B players
Ligue 1 players
Russian Premier League players
Paraná Clube players
FC Girondins de Bordeaux players
Coritiba Foot Ball Club players
CR Flamengo footballers
Reggina 1914 players
FC Spartak Moscow players
Sociedade Esportiva Palmeiras players
U.S. Livorno 1915 players
Brazilian football managers
Campeonato Brasileiro Série A managers
Campeonato Brasileiro Série B managers
Coritiba Foot Ball Club managers
Centro Sportivo Alagoano managers
Associação Chapecoense de Futebol managers
Cruzeiro Esporte Clube managers
Guarani FC managers
Atlético Clube Goianiense managers